was a Japanese daimyō of the early Edo period.

Tadatoki was born as the eldest son of Honda Tadamasa. His mother Kumahime was a granddaughter of Tokugawa Ieyasu and Oda Nobunaga.

In 1616, Tadatoki married Senhime, another granddaughter of Ieyasu, and who had been married to Toyotomi Hideyori before Hideyori's death the Siege of Osaka. As a dowry of his new bride, Tadatoki received 100,000 koku.

Tadatoki also sponsored the swordsman Miyamoto Musashi for a time. Musashi taught swordsmanship to Tadatoki's retainers; Musashi's adopted son Mikinosuke served Tadatoki as a page.

Tadatoki died of tuberculosis in 1626. Miyamoto Mikinosuke committed junshi soon afterward, choosing to follow his lord in death

Family
 Father: Honda Tadamasa (1575-1631)
 Mother: Kumahime
 Wife: Senhime (1597-1666)
 Children:
 Katsuhime (b. 1618), married Ikeda Mitsumasa
 Kochiyo (1619–1621)

References
Ruch, Barbara (2002). Engendering Faith: Women and Buddhism in Premodern Japan. (Detroit: University of Michigan), p. 233

1596 births
1626 deaths
Honda clan
Fudai daimyo
17th-century deaths from tuberculosis
People of Muromachi-period Japan
People of Azuchi–Momoyama-period Japan
People of Edo-period Japan
Tuberculosis deaths in Japan